The Shuozhou–Huanghua railway is a double-track electrified railway in China. It is used for the transportation of coal.

History
The line was jointly funded by Shenhua Group, Hebei province, and the Ministry of Railways. Construction began in November 1997. The section from Shenchi to Suning opened on 18 May 2000. The section from Suning to Huanghua port opened in October 2001.

Specification
From its western terminus at Shenchi South to its eastern terminus at Gangkou, the railway travels  and descends .

References

Railway lines in China
Railway lines opened in 2000